Sixty-nine Guggenheim Fellowships were awarded in 1939.

1939 U.S. and Canadian Fellows

1939 Latin American and Caribbean Fellows

See also
 Guggenheim Fellowship
 List of Guggenheim Fellowships awarded in 1938
 List of Guggenheim Fellowships awarded in 1940

References

1939
1939 awards